Glorious Day is a studio album by Ernie Haase & Signature Sound. This album is the first to feature their new bass singer, Paul Harkey.

Commercial performance
Glorious Day peaked at No. 40 on the Christian & Gospel Album Sales chart.

Track listing
 When Jesus Breaks the Morning
 When The Saints go marching in
 That's Why
 Scars in the Hands of Jesus
 Shh, Be Still
 Water walking God
 Noah Found Grace In the Eyes of the Lord
 Two Coats'
 While I Was a Sinner
 Glorious Day
 Sometimes I Wonder (Live acoustic version)

Charts

References

2013 albums
Ernie Haase & Signature Sound albums